Bulgakov Museum may refer to:
Bulgakov Museum in Moscow, Russia
Mikhail Bulgakov Museum, Kiev, Ukraine
Bulgakov exposition in the One Street Museum, Kiev, Ukraine